"Daysleeper"  is a song by American alternative rock band R.E.M. It was released as the first single from their eleventh studio album Up on October 12, 1998. Sung from the point of view of a night shift worker corresponding with colleagues, "Daysleeper" focuses on the disorientation of time and circadian rhythm in such a lifestyle, leading to despair and loss of identity. Lead singer Michael Stipe developed the song's concept after noticing a sign reading "daysleeper" on a New York City apartment door.

Background
During R.E.M.'s performance for VH1 Storytellers, Stipe explained the background to the song:

The song "The Lifting" from R.E.M.'s 2001 album Reveal is a prequel to "Daysleeper" and features the same character.

Music video
The video, shot at Broadway Studios in the Astoria district of New York City in September 1998, was filmed in stop-frame photography to get what Stipe called a "really druggy, really great look." It features Stipe as the office worker who goes to work at night.  All three band members then wear pajamas and bed socks, while failing to get to sleep during the day. The video was directed by the Icelandic Snorri brothers. "I think it's about the sort of alien nature of a night shift," explained Mike Mills. "The weird lighting, the fluorescent lights that you find and the isolation of working the graveyard shift—how it screws up your sleep patterns and that sort of thing, and I think that's the main image we're trying to get across."

Track listings
All songs were written by Peter Buck, Mike Mills, and Michael Stipe.

CD
 "Daysleeper" (Single edit) – 3:31
 "Emphysema" – 4:21
 "Why Not Smile" (Oxford American version) – 2:59

7-inch and cassette
 "Daysleeper" (Single edit) – 3:31
 "Emphysema" – 4:21

UK 3-inch CD
 "Daysleeper" (Single edit) – 3:31
 "Sad Professor" (Live in the studio, Toast, San Francisco, California) – 3:58

Charts

Release history

References

R.E.M. songs
1998 singles
Number-one singles in Iceland
Songs written by Michael Stipe
Songs written by Mike Mills
Songs written by Peter Buck
Song recordings produced by Michael Stipe
Song recordings produced by Mike Mills
Song recordings produced by Pat McCarthy (record producer)
Song recordings produced by Peter Buck
Warner Records singles